The 1981 Big East men's basketball tournament took place at the Carrier Dome in Syracuse, NY.  It was a single-elimination tournament with three rounds.  Boston College had the best regular season conference record and received the #1 seed.

Syracuse defeated Villanova in the championship game by a score of 83–80 in triple overtime.

Bracket

Awards
Most Valuable Player: Leo Rautins, Syracuse

All Tournament Team
 Alex Bradley, Villanova
 Tony Bruin, Syracuse
 Eric Floyd, Georgetown
 John Pinone, Villanova
 Leo Rautins, Syracuse
 Erich Santifer, Syracuse

References

External links
 

Tournament
Big East men's basketball tournament
Basketball competitions in Syracuse, New York
Big East men's basketball tournament
Big East men's basketball tournament
College basketball tournaments in New York (state)